René Verheyen (born 20 March 1952) is a retired Belgian football midfielder.

Club career
During his active career he played for Lokeren (1974–1982), Club Brugge (1983–1987) and K.A.A. Gent (1987–1988). He has since his retirement worked as a manager, most notably for Club Brugge between 1999 and 2000. He is currently managing K.M.S.K. Deinze.

International career
Verheyen was a member of the Belgian team that finished second in the 1980 UEFA European Championship, and also participated in the 1982 FIFA World Cup and the 1984 UEFA European Championship.

Honours

Player

KSC Lokeren 
 Belgian Cup: 1980–81 (runners-up)

Club Brugge

 Belgian Cup: 1985–86
 Belgian Supercup: 1986
 Bruges Matins: 1984

International 
Belgium

 UEFA European Championship: 1980 (runners-up)
 Belgian Sports Merit Award: 1980

Individual 

 Man of the Season (Belgian First Division): 1976-77, 1983–84

References

External links
 
 Biography
 Profile & stats - Lokeren

1952 births
1982 FIFA World Cup players
Association football midfielders
Belgian Pro League players
Belgian football managers
Belgian footballers
Belgium international footballers
Club Brugge KV head coaches
Club Brugge KV players
K.A.A. Gent players
K.M.S.K. Deinze managers
K.S.C. Lokeren Oost-Vlaanderen players
Living people
People from Beerse
UEFA Euro 1980 players
UEFA Euro 1984 players
Footballers from Antwerp Province